The Lobster Institute is a research and outreach center in the College of Natural Sciences and Agriculture at the University of Maine that focuses on research and promoting the sustainability of American lobster (Homarus americanus) fisheries in the United States and Canada. The center is currently led by Richard Wahle, a research professor in the School of Marine Sciences, who is serving as Director of the Lobster Institute. Lobster Institute’s office is based in Darling Marine Center in the University of Maine.

Overview 
The center has been in operations since 1987. According to the center, the state of Maine is responsible for contributing around 80% of American lobster exports from the United States since 2015. It has focused on research on American lobsters pertaining to topics such as environmental effects of lobster fisheries, lobster immune systems, species resilience in the face of climate change. Their board of advisors tends to be composed of representatives from fishermen's and lobstermen’s associations, lobster companies, and lobster researchers.

Since 2018, Lobster Institute has outlined three strategic goals that govern how it operates.:

 To be the University of Maine’s center for information and opportunities in lobster research, through engaging with stakeholders to determine the type of lobster research that needs to be prioritized based on the current needs of all parties involved.
 To enhance faculty and student incentives to engage with stakeholders, through increasing access to research funding and facilitating researchers with access to industry and fisheries.
 To increase outreach and visibility to stakeholders through traditional and new media, through providing workshops and forums to educate the public about research and information regarding the American lobster.

References 

University of Maine
Lobster fishing